Chris Evert defeated Kerry Melville in the final, 7–5, 6–4 to win the singles tennis title at the 1972 Virginia Slims Championships.

This was the inaugural edition of the tournament.

Seeds

  Billie Jean King (semifinals)
  Nancy Richey (first round)
  Margaret Smith Court (first round)
  Chris Evert (champion)
  Rosie Casals (first round)
  Kerry Melville (final)
  Françoise Dürr (semifinals)
  Wendy Overton (quarterfinals)

Draw

See also
WTA Tour Championships appearances

External links
 1972 Virginia Slims Championships draw

Singles
1972 Women's Tennis Circuit